Human development involves studies of the human condition with its core being the capability approach. The inequality adjusted Human Development Index is used as a way of measuring actual progress in human development by the United Nations. It is an alternative approach to a single focus on economic growth, and focused more on social justice, as a way of understanding progress

The United Nations Development Programme defines human development as "the process of enlarging people's choices", said choices allowing them to "lead a long and healthy life, to be educated, to enjoy a decent standard of living", as well as "political freedom, other guaranteed human rights and various ingredients of self-respect". Thus, human development is about much more than economic growth, which is only a means of enlarging people's choices. Fundamental to enlarging these choices is building human capabilities—the range of things that people can do or be in life. Capabilities are "the substantive freedoms [a person] enjoys to lead the kind of life [they have] reason to value".

History
Human Development Theory has roots in ancient philosophy and early economic theory. Aristotle noted that "Wealth is evidently not the good we are seeking, for it is merely useful for something else", and Adam Smith and Karl Marx were concerned with human capabilities. The theory grew in importance in the 1980s with the work of Amartya Sen and his Human Capabilities perspective, which played a role in his receiving the 1998 Nobel Prize in Economics. Notable early active economists who formulated the modern concept of human development theory were Mahbub ul Haq, Üner Kirdar, and Amartya Sen. The Human Development Index  developed for the United Nations Development Programme (UNDP) stems from this early research. In 2000, Sen and Sudhir Anand published a notable development of the theory to address issues in sustainability.

Martha Nussbaum's publications in the late 1990s and 2000s pushed theorists to pay more attention to the human in the theory, and particularly to human emotion. A separate approach stems in part from needs theories of psychology which in part started with Abraham Maslow (1968). Representative of these are the Human-Scale Development approach developed by Manfred Max-Neef in the mid-to-late 1980s which addresses human needs and satisfiers which are more or less static across time and context.

Anthropologists and sociologists have also challenged perspectives on Human Development Theory that stem from neoclassical economics. Examples of scholars include, Diane Elson, Raymond Apthorpe, Irene van Staveren, and Ananta Giri. Elson (1997) proposes that human development should move towards a more diverse approach to individual incentives. This will involve a shift from seeing people as agents in control of their choices selecting from a set of possibilities utilizing human capital as one of many assets. Instead, theorists should see people as having more mutable choices influenced by social structures and changeable capacities and using a humanistic approach to theory including factors relating to an individual's culture, age, gender, and family roles. These extensions express a dynamic approach to the theory, a dynamism that has been advocated by Ul Haq and Sen, in spite of the implicit criticism of those two figures.

Measurement

One measure of human development is the Human Development Index (HDI), formulated by the United Nations Development Programme. The index encompasses statistics such as life expectancy at birth, an education index (calculated using mean years of schooling and expected years of schooling), and gross national income per capita. Though this index does not capture every aspect that contributes to human capability, it is a standardized way of quantifying human capability across nations and communities. Aspects that could be left out of the calculations include incomes that are unable to be quantified, such as staying home to raise children or bartering goods/services, as well as individuals' perceptions of their own well being. Other measures of human development include the Human Poverty Index (HPI) and the Gender Empowerment Measure. It measures many aspects of development.

Pillars
There are six basic pillars of human development: equity, sustainability, productivity, empowerment, cooperation and security.
 Equity is the idea of fairness for every person, between men and women; we each have the right to education and health care. 
 Sustainability is the view that we all have the right to earn a living that can sustain our lives and have access to a more even distribution of goods. 
 Productivity states the full participation of people in the process of income generation. This also means that the government needs more efficient social programs for its people. 
 Empowerment is the freedom of the people to influence development and decisions that affect their lives. 
 Cooperation stipulates participation and belonging to communities and groups as a means of mutual enrichment and a source of social meaning. 
 Security offers people development opportunities freely and safely with confidence that they will not disappear suddenly in the future.

Human rights
In seeking that something else, human development shares a common vision with human rights. The goal is human freedom. Therefore, human development is interconnected with human rights and human freedom, because in well-managed prisons life expectancy and literacy as measured by the Human Development Index could be quite high. And in pursuing capabilities and realizing rights, this freedom is vital. People must be free to exercise their choices and to participate in decision-making that affects their lives. Human development and human rights are mutually reinforcing, helping to secure the well-being and dignity of all people, building self-respect and the respect of others. In the days of fast globalization, human rights issues surface in relation to multilateral corporations and poverty issues. The idea of human development stipulates the need for education, better conditions for work and more choices for individuals. The idea goes with human rights. The two concepts are simultaneously promoted first by good governance, implementation of human rights policy and a formation of participation of community in decision making processes, second by the promotion of civil and political rights and economic and social rights, which are components of the level of development. For instance, the right for education relates to intellectual development, and political rights relates to the level of the political development of that society.

Health
The  axis of development is that it may harm or benefit human health, and eventually human development, as it proceeds. In concern of health, we divided it into disease and poverty issues. On 16 June 2006 the World Health Organization
(WHO) presented the report Preventing disease through healthy environments. No one in the world is without the environmental health issues and wealth problems. Development had been first approached as the future for more cure and hope. However, the criticism argues of the side effects such as environmental pollution and the gap between increasing wealth and poor. The ineffectiveness of many public health policies in terms of health inequality issues and social problems should be held by global community. Therefore, the ultimate goal is to achieve environmental sustainability. 
Some critics say development is undermined by health concerns as it both directly and indirectly influences growth to be lower. HIV/AIDS, in addition to malaria, has negatively influenced development and increased poverty in many places, especially in Africa. Achieving adequate health standards is important for the success of development and the abolition of poverty.

Human Development Report

The Global Human Development Reports (HDR) is an annual publication released by the UNDP's Human Development Report Office and contains the Human Development Index. Within global HDR there are four main indexes: Human Development Index, Gender-related Development Index, Gender Empowerment Measure and the Human Poverty Index. There are not only a global Human Development Reports but there are also regional and national reports. The Regional, National and subnational (for portions of countries) HDRs take various approaches, according to the strategic thinking of the individual authorship groups that craft the individual reports. In the United States, for example, Measure of America has been publishing human development reports since 2008 with a modified index, the human development index American Human Development Index, which measures the same three basic dimensions but uses slightly different indicators to better reflect the U.S. context and to maximize use of available data.

The Human Development Index is a way for people and nations to see the policy flaws of regions and countries. Although the releasing of this information is believed to encourage countries to alter their policies, there is no evidence demonstrating changes nor is there any motivation for countries to do so.

Human Development Index

The Human Development Index (HDI) is the normalized measure of life expectancy, education and per capita income for countries worldwide. It is an improved standard means of measuring well-being, especially child welfare and thus human development. Although this index makes an effort to simplify human development, it is much more complex than any index or set of indicators.

The 2007 report showed a small increase in world HDI in comparison with the previous year's report. This rise was fueled by a general improvement in the developing world, especially of the least developed countries group. This marked improvement at the bottom was offset with a decrease in HDI of high income countries.

Human Poverty Index

To reflect gaps in the Human Development Index, the United Nations came out with the Human Poverty Index (HPI) in 1997. The HPI measures the deficiencies in the three indexes of the human development index: long and healthy life, knowledge and a decent standard of living. The HPI is meant to provide a broader view of human development and is adapted to developed countries to reveal social exclusion.

Social Progress Index

The Social Progress Index is published by the non-profit Social Progress Imperative. It combines indicators related to social welfare, equality, personal freedom and sustainability.

The Earth Summits, Agenda 21, Millennium Development Goals and Sustainable Development Goals

In an attempt to promote human development, the United Nations supports decennial Earth Summits where the members to the UN bring together the best of humanity. In several rounds they discuss what are humanities biggest problems, quantify them and develop a plan of action on how to solve these problems. This plan of action is called Agenda 21an agenda to make sure humanity will still be around after the year 2100. Thousands of cities now have a local Agenda 21 and more and more companies and organisations also align their strategic plan with the strategic plan of Agenda21. With the approaching of the year 2000, UN Secretary General Kofi Annan was compelled to develop something that existed in the private sector: setting out a long term plan, a mid term plan and a short term planning. This endeavour supports on Agenda21 and was named the Millennium Development Goals (MDGs) which ran from 2000–2015. The United Nations made a commitment to accomplish these goals by 2015 and thus make an attempt to promote human development.

As the experience of this exercise was perceived successful, a follow-up program was developed and named as the Sustainable Development Goals (SDGs).

Rethinking Human Development

In 2020, the International Science Council (ISC) and the Human Development Programme (UNDP) have started an initiative on Rethinking Human Development exploring the multiple dimensions and viewpoints regarding what Human Development means in today’s world.

Augmented Human Development Index 
Leandro Prados de la Escosura has an alternative dataset for human development, which he calls the Augmented Human Development Index.

See also
Human security
International development
Progress
Social change

References

External links
About Human Development on the HDR Office

International development
Development economics